Gastrinodes argoplaca is a moth of the family Geometridae. It is found in Australia.

References

Boarmiini